Scopula kuhitangica is a moth of the family Geometridae. It is endemic to  Turkmenistan. The habitat consists of the Amygdalus-belt at Juniperus-open forest.

References

Moths described in 1998
kuhitangica
Endemic fauna of Turkmenistan
Moths of Asia